Bartosz Brenes (born 25 July 1989 in San José, Costa Rica) is a chart-topping house DJ, producer, remixer and record label owner. He began his career as a DJ at the age of 16 in Belgium, and quickly started touring throughout Europe. Shortly after, Bartosz started producing electronic dance music using Ableton Live and by 2009, the 20-year-old had already established 17:44 Records. His 2010 single "Heaven" topped the Russian Music Charts for 73 consecutive weeks, peaking at #3 on the Russian Billboard chart. Since 2011, Bartosz has been commissioned to remix artists such as A-Trak, Amanda Wilson, Bob Sinclar, Boy George, David Vendetta, Dillon Francis, Eddie Amador, Gary Pine, Janelle Monáe, Jean Beauvoir, Joachim Garraud, Joe Smooth, Kurd Maverick, Olav Basoski, Perry Farrell, Ron Carroll, Sander Kleinenberg, Sophie Ellis-Bextor, Steve Edwards and Tommy Trash just to name a few. With over 100 productions (originals, remixes and ghost tracks) on labels like Armada, Defected, Dim Mak, Flamingo, Fool's Gold, Hed Kandi, Ministry of Sound, Nettwerk, Spinnin', Stealth or Subliminal, Bartosz quickly gathered the attention of high-profile DJ's including Tiësto, Dimitri Vegas & Like Mike, Knife Party, The Crystal Method, Paul Oakenfold, Alesso, Nicky Romero, Showtek, Cedric Gervais, Morgan Page, John Dahlbäck and Michael Woods. In 2012, Bartosz achieved popularity with his remix of "Breaking Up" by Chuckie, which became a mainstay on the Beatport top downloads charts for almost half a year.

Discography

Remixes

Peak chart positions

Music videos

References

External links
Facebook
Twitter
Soundcloud
YouTube
Beatport
Discogs

1989 births
People from San José, Costa Rica
Living people
Belgian record labels
Club DJs
Ableton Live users
Costa Rican musicians
Costa Rican dance musicians
Belgian people of Polish descent
Costa Rican people of Belgian descent
Costa Rican people of Polish descent